Terry Pechota (born February 26, 1947) is an American attorney who was the 32nd United States Attorney for the District of South Dakota.

United States Attorney
He was nominated by President Jimmy Carter to be the 32nd United States Attorney for the District of South Dakota. He was confirmed by the United States Senate. He was the first Sioux Indian to be named a U.S. Attorney. He handled several landmark cases, including the Black Hills of South Dakota case for the Rosebud Sioux in regards to the 1868 treaty. Pechota stated "The consensus is, the tribes want this land back." He stepped down from the position in 1981 and accepted a job as counsel for the Native American Rights Fund in Boulder, Colorado. He returned to South Dakota the following year.

Personal life
Pechota was born and raised in Colome, South Dakota, and is of Rosebud Sioux and Czechoslovakian descent.

His wife, Anita Ramerowski, was also a lawyer.

See also
United States Attorney for the District of South Dakota

References

Living people
1947 births
University of Iowa College of Law alumni
20th-century American lawyers
South Dakota Democrats
South Dakota lawyers
United States Attorneys for the District of South Dakota
People from Tripp County, South Dakota
People from Rapid City, South Dakota